Sergeant Alejandro Renteria Ruiz  (June 26, 1923 – November 20, 2009) was a United States Army soldier who received the Medal of Honor, the United States' highest military decoration, for his actions in the Battle of Okinawa in the Ryukyu Islands during World War II.

Early years
Ruiz, a Mexican-American, was born and raised in Loving, New Mexico, and enlisted in the United States Army in the town of Carlsbad, New Mexico upon the outbreak of World War II. He was assigned to the U.S. 27th Infantry Division after completing basic training.

World War II
During World War II, the conquest of the Japanese island of Okinawa was considered vital for the Allied forces as a step towards an invasion of the Japanese mainland. The invasion (codenamed Operation Iceberg) was the largest amphibious operation of the Pacific war, and involved units of the U.S. Tenth Army, commanded by Lieutenant General Simon Bolivar Buckner, Jr.  These consisted of III Amphibious Corps (1st and 6th Marine Divisions, with 2nd Marine Division as an afloat reserve), and XXIV Corps (7th, 77th, 96th and 27th Infantry Divisions).

On April 28, 1945, PFC Ruiz's unit was pinned down by machine gun fire coming from a camouflaged Japanese pillbox and was unable to advance to its assigned objective.  Ruiz, on his own initiative, charged the pillbox under a hail of machine gun fire. On his second attempt, he was able to neutralize the pillbox by killing all of its occupants.  For his actions he was awarded the Medal of Honor. On June 26, 1946, President Harry S. Truman presented Ruiz with the Medal of Honor in a ceremony held at the White House.

Medal of Honor citation

Korean War
He served in the Korean War, finally retiring in the mid 1960s as a master sergeant.

Honors
Ruiz resided in Visalia, California and actively participated in activities honoring Medal of Honor recipients. Ruiz died on November 20, 2009, of congestive heart failure.  The town of Visalia has honored Ruiz by naming the "Alejandro R. Ruiz Sr. Park" after him, located at North Burke Street and Buena Vista Street.

Awards and decorations
Among PFC Alejandro R. Ruiz' decorations and medals were the following:

See also

List of Medal of Honor recipients for World War II
Hispanic Medal of Honor recipients
Hispanic Americans in World War II

References

External links

1923 births
2009 deaths
United States Army soldiers
World War II recipients of the Medal of Honor
United States Army Medal of Honor recipients
United States Army personnel of World War II
United States Army personnel of the Korean War
American people of Mexican descent
People from Eddy County, New Mexico
People from Yountville, California